Siddhpur railway station is a railway station in Patan district, Gujarat, India on the Western line of the Western railway network. Passenger, Express and Superfast trains halt here.

Nearby stations

Dharewada is the nearest railway station towards , whereas Kamli is the nearest railway station towards .

Trains

The following Express and Superfast trains halt at Siddhpur railway station in both directions:

 14805/06 Yesvantpur - Barmer AC Express
 14803/04 Bhagat Ki Kothi - Ahmedabad Weekly Express
 22915/16 Bandra Terminus - Hisar Superfast Express
 16507/08 Jodhpur - Bangalore City Express (via Hubballi)
 22473/74 Bandra Terminus - Bikaner Superfast Express
 19565/66 Okha - Dehradun Uttaranchal Express
 19707/08 Bandra Terminus - Jaipur Amrapur Aravali Express
 19413/14 Ahmedabad - Kolkata Sare Jahan Se Accha Express
 19411/12 Ahmedabad - Ajmer Intercity Express
 19031/32 Ahmedabad - Haridwar Yoga Express
 19223/24 Ahmedabad - Jammu Tawi Express

References 

Railway stations in Patan district
Ahmedabad railway division
Siddhpur